The small sun squirrel (Heliosciurus punctatus)  is a species of rodent in the family Sciuridae. It is found in Ivory Coast, Ghana, Liberia, Sierra Leone, and possibly Guinea. Its natural habitat is subtropical or tropical moist lowland forests.

References

Heliosciurus
Rodents of Africa
Mammals described in 1853
Taxonomy articles created by Polbot